Dolnje Ložine (in older sources also Dolenje Ložine) is a small settlement in the Upper Rinža Valley northwest of Kočevje in southern Slovenia. The area is part of the traditional region of Lower Carniola and is now included in the Southeast Slovenia Statistical Region.

Name
The name of the settlement was changed from Srednje Ložine to Dolnje Ložine in 1952. In the past the German name was Niederloschin.

Cultural heritage
A small open roadside chapel-shrine in the settlement is dedicated to the Holy Family and was built in 1913.

References

External links
Dolnje Ložine on Geopedia
Pre–World War II list of oeconyms and family names in Dolnje Ložine

Populated places in the Municipality of Kočevje